Warnke is a German surname. It may also refer to:

 Warnke Covered Bridge, historic bridge in Ohio, United States
 Bernie Warnke Propellers, American manufacturer
 Willam–Warnke yield criterion, function in solid mechanics